The 1919–20 FA Cup was the 45th season of the world's oldest association football competition, the Football Association Challenge Cup (more usually known as the FA Cup), and the first since the cancellation of all football competitions due to the First World War. Aston Villa won the competition, beating Huddersfield Town 1–0 in the final at Stamford Bridge, London.

Matches were scheduled to be played at the stadium of the team named first on the date specified for each round, which was always a Saturday. If scores were level after 90 minutes had been played, a replay would take place at the stadium of the second-named team later the same week. If the replayed match was drawn further replays would be held at neutral venues until a winner was determined. If scores were level after 90 minutes had been played in a replay, a 30-minute period of extra time would be played.

Calendar
The format of the FA Cup for the season had two preliminary rounds, six qualifying rounds, four proper rounds, and the semi finals and final.

First round proper
42 of the 44 clubs from the First and Second divisions joined the 12 clubs who came through the qualifying rounds. Two sides, Port Vale and Rotherham County were entered instead at the Sixth Qualifying Round. Rotherham County were newly elected to the Football League due to its expansion in the 1919–20 season, while Port Vale were entered into the League after eight games, following the failure of Leeds City. Port Vale came through the qualifier, while Rotherham went out.

Ten non-league sides were given byes to the First Round to bring the total number of teams up to 64. These were:

Southampton
Millwall
Queens Park Rangers
Crystal Palace
Swindon Town
Plymouth Argyle
Reading
Portsmouth
Brentford
Cardiff City

32 matches were scheduled to be played on Saturday, 10 January 1920. Eight matches were drawn and went to replays in the following midweek fixture.

Second round proper
The 16 Second Round matches were played on Saturday, 31 January 1920. One match was drawn, with the replay taking place in the following midweek fixture.

Third round proper
The eight Third Round matches were scheduled for Saturday, 21 February 1920. There were no replays.

Fourth round proper
The four Fourth Round matches were scheduled for Saturday, 6 March 1920. There were no replays.

Semi-finals
The semi-final matches were played on Saturday, 27 March 1920. Aston Villa and Huddersfield Town won and went on to meet in the final.

Final

The Final, the first since the end of the First World War, was contested by Aston Villa and Huddersfield at Stamford Bridge. Aston Villa won 1–0, with the goal coming in extra time from Billy Kirton.

Match details

See also
FA Cup Final

References
General
Official site; fixtures and results service at TheFA.com
1919-20 FA Cup at rsssf.com
1919-20 FA Cup at soccerbase.com

Specific

1919-20
FA
Cup